Periphery II: This Time It's Personal is the second studio album by American progressive metal band Periphery. The album was released on June 29, 2012 through Roadrunner Records in Australia and on July 3 through Sumerian in America. It was produced by Misha Mansoor and Adam Getgood. It is the first record by the band to feature new members Mark Holcomb and Adam "Nolly" Getgood, replacing Alex Bois and Tom Murphy on guitar and bass, respectively.

Release and promotion
On May 30, 2012, Periphery posted an album teaser featuring the intro track "Muramasa."
The album's first single, "Make Total Destroy," was released on iTunes Tuesday, June 5. On June 14, 2012, the band released the track "Scarlet" on SiriusXM's Liquid Metal channel. The official stream of the song was released on June 28 on Sumerian Records' YouTube channel. The whole album was also streamed on Metal Hammer's website from June 29 for visitors to listen to.

Commercial performance
The album sold nearly 12,000 copies in its first week of release, reaching #44 on the Billboard 200 list. In Canada, the album debuted at #89 on the Canadian Albums Chart.

It was ranked number 3 in Guitar World's "Top 50 Albums of 2012."

Track listing

Personnel
 Spencer Sotelo — lead vocals
 Misha "Bulb" Mansoor — guitar, synths, production
 Jake Bowen — guitar, synths, programming
 Mark Holcomb — guitar
 Adam "Nolly" Getgood – bass, guitar, production
 Matt Halpern — drums, percussion

Guest musicians
 Guest guitar solo on "Have a Blast" by Guthrie Govan
 Guest guitar solo on "Erised" by John Petrucci of Dream Theater
 Guest guitar solo on "Mile Zero" by Wes Hauch, formerly of The Faceless
 Alice McIlrath — violin
 Lezlie Smith — cello

Production
 Misha "Bulb" Mansoor – producer
 Adam "Nolly" Getgood – producer
 Taylor Larson – engineering, mixing
 Will Donnelly – additional engineering
 Logan Mader – mastering
 Randy Slaugh – string arrangement and production (on "Have a Blast")
 Ken Dudley – engineer

Charts

References

Periphery (band) albums
2012 albums
Sumerian Records albums
Century Media Records albums
Roadrunner Records albums